Seong of Balhae, (died 794), sometimes called by his birth-name Dae Hwa-yeo, was the 5th ruler of the Balhae. He was the grandson of King Mun, his father being the deceased heir Dae Goeng-rim.

Reign 
He was the grandson of Mun of Balhae and Empress Hyoui. His father Dae Goeng-rim who died before inheriting the inheriting the throne.

He chose the era name Jungheung (중흥, 中興). King Seong was a very physically weak person, and lived for a few months after his rise to the throne. The most notable accomplishment that was done during his reign was the moving of the capital to Sanggyeong.

He didn't marry or had children. After his death his uncle, Gang of Balhae,became King.

See also
List of Korean monarchs
History of Korea

References

Balhae rulers
Mohe peoples
794 deaths
8th-century rulers in Asia
Year of birth unknown